USS Adroit (SP-248) was a steam yacht brought into the United States Navy, but never commissioned.

Built in New York
Adroit was built as Winchester at City Island, New York in 1907 by the Robert Jacobs Shipyard. The first of a series of fast yachts of that name, her owner replaced her with a larger vessel after several years. She was sold and renamed Adroit in about 1916. She was acquired by the Navy in April 1917 from Mr. F. H. McAdoo of New York City.

Service history
After she had begun fitting out under the direction of Lt. H. B. Peschau, NNV, Adroit was found to be highly unseaworthy and of extremely short cruising range. Consequently, she was never commissioned and was returned to her owner on 30 April 1918. Presumably, her name—which had appeared on the Navy list— was stricken from that list soon thereafter.

Post war service
Her subsequent career as a pleasure craft extended for more than another two decades. She was renamed Aera in 1928 and remained listed in yachting registers until the early 1940s.

Notes 

Citations

Bibliography 

Online resources
  Winchester American Steam Yacht, 1907
 

Patrol vessels of the United States Navy
Steam yachts
Ships built in City Island, Bronx
1907 ships
World War I patrol vessels of the United States